The Augusta Commercial Historic District encompasses the historic commercial center of the city of Augusta, Arkansas.  Located on the eastern bank of the White River, Augusta developed in the late 19th and early 20th centuries as a major crossing point of the river in eastern Arkansas.  Located between the river and Second Street, and between Pearl and Mulberry Streets are a collection of 44 historic buildings, including warehouses along the waterfront and commercial and retail buildings on the adjacent streets.

The district was listed on the National Register of Historic Places in 2008.

See also
National Register of Historic Places listings in Woodruff County, Arkansas

References

Italianate architecture in Arkansas
Buildings designated early commercial in the National Register of Historic Places in Arkansas
Commercial buildings completed in 1897
Historic districts on the National Register of Historic Places in Arkansas
National Register of Historic Places in Woodruff County, Arkansas
1897 establishments in Arkansas
Augusta, Arkansas